is a Japanese singer and actress. She is a former member of the idol group Keyakizaka46.

Early life and education 
Yurina Hirate was born on June 25, 2001. In March 2017, she graduated from junior high school.

Career 
Hirate was the choreography center of the idol group Keyakizaka46 for eight singles. When she was selected as the center for the first time (for Keyakizaka46's debut single "Silent Majority", released in April 2016), she was 14 and was the youngest member of the girl group. The second Keyakizaka46's single "Sekai ni wa Ai Shika Nai" (released in August 2016) contained Hirate's solo song as one of the coupling tracks.

On October 8, 2016, at the GirlsAward 2016 Autumn/Winter show, she made her catwalk debut. In January 2017, she and Rika Watanabe (also from Keyakizaka46) appeared as models in the women's fashion magazine  for the first time. The 2017/14 issue of the manga magazine Weekly Young Jump (released on March 2) marked her first solo magazine cover. In the 2017/16 issue of the manga magazine Weekly Shōnen Magazine, she again had a solo cover.

In June 2016, she made her acting debut in Keyakizaka46's TV drama . Since April 17, 2017, she has been a regular on a popular radio show for teenagers titled School of Lock! on Tokyo FM. Hirate played one of the lead roles in the 2017 Nippon TV dorama .

Hirate withdrew from Keyakizaka46 on January 23, 2020.

On December 9, 2020, Hirate performed her debut single "Dance no Riyū" for the first time at the FNS Music Festival. The single was later released digitally on December 25 with an accompanying music video released three days earlier. Her second single "Kakegae no Nai Sekai" was released on September 24, 2021. A music video for the song was later released on December 26, 2021.

On December 21, 2022, Hirate was announced to be the first artist to sign with Naeco, a newly established label under Hybe Japan, in order to expand her career globally. She was set to join the company's social platform, Weverse, in early 2023.

Public image 
Hirate has been dubbed a "rebirth of Momoe Yamaguchi", "a masterpiece beyond Atsuko Maeda" and called one of the most attractive idols of 2016.

Personal life
Hirate is skilled at basketball, ballet, cartwheel, swing on bars and blowing up balloons etc. When Hirate was little, she has been influenced by her friends from nursery school and fallen in love with basketball. She joined the basketball club in the second grade and was assigned to the position of centre. Her team even won a championship at a tournament when she was in 6th grade. Besides, Hirate learned ballet when she was 5 years old to 12 years old.

Discography

Singles

Music videos

As lead artist

Guest appearances

Filmography

Films

Television

Awards and nominations

Notes

References

External links 
 Yurina Hirate

2001 births
Japanese female idols
21st-century Japanese women singers
21st-century Japanese actresses
Keyakizaka46 members
Living people
Actors from Aichi Prefecture
Musicians from Aichi Prefecture
Hybe Corporation artists